András Székely (5 March 1910 – 25 January 1943) was a Hungarian swimmer who won a bronze medal in the 4 × 200 m freestyle relay at the 1932 Summer Olympics. He won a European title in this event in 1931.

Székely was Jewish. He was killed by the Nazis in 1943 at a forced labor camp in Chernihiv, Ukraine.

See also
List of select Jewish swimmers

References

External links

1910 births
1943 deaths
Hungarian male swimmers
Jewish swimmers
Olympic swimmers of Hungary
Jewish Hungarian sportspeople
Hungarian Jews who died in the Holocaust
Swimmers at the 1932 Summer Olympics
Olympic bronze medalists for Hungary
Olympic bronze medalists in swimming
Hungarian male freestyle swimmers
European Aquatics Championships medalists in swimming
Medalists at the 1932 Summer Olympics
Hungarian civilians killed in World War II
Hungarian World War II forced labourers